The 1996 World Weightlifting Championships were held in Warsaw, Poland from 3 May to 11 May. The women's competition in the 59 kilograms division was staged on 6 May.

Medalists

Records

Results

New records

References
Results
Weightlifting Database

1996 World Weightlifting Championships